Ipomoea corymbosa is a species of morning glory, native throughout Latin America from Mexico as far south as Peru and widely naturalised elsewhere. Its common names include Christmasvine, Christmaspops, and snakeplant.

Description and names

Its flowers secrete copious amount of nectar, and the honey that bees make from it is very clear and aromatic. It also grows in Cuba, where it usually blooms from early December to February. It is considered one of the main honey plants of the island.

This plant is often used for purposes other than recreation, as natives of Mexico consider the powder produced from its seeds a tool for divination and communion with spirits. Because of the widespread use among native tribes, Colonial rules initially feared Ololiuqui and banned it introducing harsh punishments for users.

Chemical properties

The Nahuatl word ololiuhqui means "round thing", and refers to the small, brown, oval seeds of the morning glory, not the plant itself, which is called coaxihuitl (“snake-plant") in Nahuatl, and hiedra, bejuco or quiebraplatos in the Spanish language. The seeds, in Spanish, are sometimes called semilla de la Virgen (seeds of the Virgin Mary).  While little of it is known outside of Mexico, its seeds were perhaps the most common psychedelic drug used by the natives.

In 1941, Richard Evans Schultes first identified ololiuhqui as Turbina corymbosa and the chemical composition was first described in 1960 in a paper by Albert Hofmann. The seeds contain ergine (LSA), an ergoline alkaloid which is also present in ergot of rye and is similar in structure to LSD. Ergot of rye was part of the Kykeon, the drink which was a component of the Eleusinian mysteries. The psychedelic properties of Turbina corymbosa and a comparison of the potency of different varieties were studied in the Central Intelligence Agency's MKULTRA Subproject 22 in 1956.

Distribution
This species is an invasive species to the United States, Europe (Spain), and Australia, where it has become more naturalized.

See also
 Xtabay

References

External links 

Erowid Morning Glory vault
Erowid Corymbosa Vault

Convolvulaceae
Entheogens
Herbal and fungal hallucinogens
Natural sources of lysergamides
Flora of Mexico
Flora of Cuba
Flora of Peru
Plants described in 1759
Project MKUltra
Flora without expected TNC conservation status